Greenhide is a 1926 Australian film directed by Charles Chauvel. Only part of the film survives today.

Plot
High society girl Margery Paton (Elsa Chauvel) leaves the city to live on her father's cattle property, run by "Greenhide Gavin" (Bruce Gordon). She carries romantic notions of the bush, of "being swung to the saddle by big brown arms", but Greenhide Gavin is initially only annoyed by her presence. Greenhide contains a blossoming romance, and the thwarting of a plot to steal cattle.

Cast
Elsie Sylvaney as Margery Paton
Bruce Gordon as Greenhide Gavin
Jules Murray-Prior as Slab Rawlins
Irma Dearden as Polly Andrews
Gerald Barlow as Sam Paton
Frank Thorn as Tom Mullins
Joe Mackaway as Phil Mackin
Alfred Greenup as Bill Mullins
Nell Kerwin
George Barrett

Production
Greenhide was Charles Chauvel's second film, following The Moth of Moonbi (1926), and his final silent film. Chauvel scouted his leading lady, then Elsie May Wilcox, after seeing her in a stage musical called Crackers at the Cremorne Theatre in Brisbane, Queensland. Though she was reluctant at first to audition, Chauvel convinced her to perform a screentest, and ultimately offered her the role. The pair began a romantic relationship over the course of filming, and Charles and Elsa were married on 5 June 1927, at St James Church, Sydney, the ceremony officiated by Charles' brother, the Reverend John Chauvel.

On-location filming took place at Walloon Station in Dawson Valley, Queensland. The production encampment, a collection of tents accommodating twenty people, was informally named "Camp Greenhide" by locals. The producers were at Walloon Station filming the production in June 1926.
Interior filming took place in a studio in Brisbane. Chauvel played a phonograph recording of "In a Monastery Garden" to induce realistic tears from Elsa Chauvel without the need to use glycerine drops.

Release
Greenhide was screened throughout most of Queensland without the use of a distribution agency. Charles and Elsa Chauvel personally transported prints of the film from town to town, and tried to convince theatre owners to replace booked American films with a local alternative. Prior to each screening, Elsa would provide a dramatic monologue and introduction.

In Brisbane and Sydney, Greenhide screened through distributor Hoyts, and broke records in Brisbane. However the movie struggled to find distribution in country areas and the Southern cities. In 1927 it was reported the film still had to earn £6,030 to recoup all its costs, due in part to the large portion of box office earnings taken by distributors and exhibitors. This caused Australian Film Productions to go into voluntary liquidation in 1929. Later the liquidator left Brisbane and copies of the film were abandoned in a building and caught fire.

Greenhide, in its original form, was 8000 feet long, but today only 2475 feet of 35mm film survive (37 mins at 18 frames per second).

References

External links
 

1926 films
Australian silent feature films
Australian black-and-white films
1920s English-language films